Herbert Winslow (September 22, 1848 – September 25, 1914) was a rear admiral in the United States Navy.

Biography
He was born in 1848 in Roxbury, Massachusetts to John Ancrum Winslow. Through an entirely paternal line he was a direct descendant of Mayflower passenger Edward Winslow. He entered the United States Naval Academy in July 1865 and graduated four years later.  He married Elizabeth Maynard (December 1854 – March 3, 1899), daughter of Lafayette Maynard, in 1876. He commanded the USS Fern at the Battle of Santiago de Cuba on July 3, 1898. His wife died in 1899. He retired on September 22, 1910 on account of his age and moved to Cherbourg, France.

He was a hereditary companion of the Massachusetts Commandery of the Military Order of the Loyal Legion of the United States by right of his father's service in the Union Navy during the American Civil War.

He died in Florence, Italy on September 25, 1914. He is buried with his father at Forest Hills Cemetery in Jamaica Plain, Boston.

References

1848 births
1914 deaths
American military personnel of the Spanish–American War
United States Navy admirals
United States Naval Academy alumni